is a small near-Earth asteroid that made an extremely close approach within  from Earth's center on 20 October 2022 at 22:45 UTC. It was discovered about 14 hours before closest approach by the Asteroid Terrestrial-impact Last Alert System (ATLAS) survey telescope at Mauna Loa Observatory, Hawaii on 20 November 2022. During the close approach, the asteroid passed above the northern hemisphere of Earth and reached a peak brightness of magnitude 10, just 40 times fainter than the threshold of naked eye visibility.

Notes

References

External links 
 
 
 

Minor planet object articles (unnumbered)
20221020
20221020